The Russian foreign agent law requires anyone who receives "support" from outside Russia or is under "influence" from outside Russia to register and declare themselves as "foreign agents". Once registered, they are subject to additional audits and are obliged to mark all their publications with a 24-word disclaimer saying that they are being distributed by a "foreign agent". The phrase "foreign agent" in Russian has strong associations with Cold War-era espionage. The law has been heavily criticized both in Russia and internationally as violating human rights, and as a tool used to suppress civil society and press freedom within Russia, particularly groups opposed to Vladimir Putin.

The law was implemented in response to protests against Vladimir Putin's return to the presidency in the 2012 presidential election, and was designed to constrain independent NGOs. The bill was introduced in July 2012 by legislators from the governing United Russia party and signed into law by Putin on 20 July 2012. The new legislation consisted of a series of amendments to the criminal code and the laws "On Public Associations", "On Noncommercial Organizations", and "On Combating Money Laundering and the Financing of Terrorism". The law went into effect in November 2012, and was actively enforced by the Federal Security Service from February 2013. Its supporters initially likened it to United States legislation on lobbyists employed by foreign governments. Since its introduction, the scope of the law has been progressively expanded.

At first, the law applied to NGOs receiving funds from abroad that engaged in "political activity". The "foreign agent" designation was first imposed against media organisations in 2017. In December 2019, Putin signed an expansion of the legislation to include private individuals or groups receiving any amount of foreign funding which published "printed, audio, audio visual or other reports and materials". In September 2021, the law was expanded to include Russian citizens who report or share information on crime, corruption or other problems related to the military, space and security services or their employees.

Varieties of "foreign agents"

Russian non-profit organizations

On 21 November 2012, the Federal Law of 20 July 2012 №121-FZ "On Amendments to Legislative Acts of the Russian Federation regarding the Regulation of the Activities of Non-profit Organisations Performing the Functions of a Foreign Agent", which is the amendments to the Federal Law of 19 May 1995 №82-FZ "On public associations", the Federal Law of 12 January 1996 №7-FZ "On Non-profit Organizations", the Federal Law of 7 August 2001 №115-FZ "On countering the legalization (laundering) of the proceeds of crime and the financing of terrorism", the Criminal Code of Russia and the Criminal Procedure Code of Russia, entered into force. In accordance to this law, Russian non-profit organization, except for state and municipal companies, can be declared foreign agent if it participates in political activity in Russia and receives funding from foreign sources. Political activity is defined as any influence to public opinion and public policy including a sending a requests and petitions.

Media

On 25 November 2017, the amendments, contained in the Federal Law of 25 November 2017 №327-FZ "On Amendments to the articles 10.4 and 15.3 of the Federal Law "On Information, Information Technologies and Information Protection" and to the article 6 of the Russian Federation Law "On the media"", entered into force. In accordance to these amendments, any foreign juridical person distributing printed, audio or audio-visual materials can be declared a foreign media performing the functions of a "foreign agent" even if such juridical person doesn't have branches or representative offices in Russia. Foreign juridical persons designated as a foreign media performing the functions of a "foreign agent" are obliged the Russian foreign agent law.

On 2 December 2019, the amendments, contained in the Federal Law of 2 December 2019 №426-FZ "On Amendments to the Russian Federation Law "On the media" and the Federal Law "On Information, Information Technologies and Information Protection"", entered into force. In accordance to these amendments, foreign juridical persons declared a foreign media performing the functions of a "foreign agent" must form a Russian juridical person and inform Russian authorities about this.

In April 2021, the Ministry of Justice stated that a media outlet with funding from outside Russia could be designated as a "foreign agent" for publishing material in the Russian language, even if this did not constitute participation in political activity.

Russian citizens, foreign citizens, stateless natural persons who distribute materials of foreign media performing functions of "foreign agent" and receive funding from foreign sources

The amendments, contained in the Federal Law of 2 December 2019 №426-FZ "On Amendments to the Russian Federation Law "On the media" and the Federal Law "On Information, Information Technologies and Information Protection"", also provide the possibility to designate natural person as "foreign agent". This requires that natural person distributes a materials of a foreign media performing functions of a "foreign agent" (for example, in social media) and receives funding from foreign sources (for example, salary from international company).

Russian citizens, foreign citizens, stateless natural persons who participate in political activity in Russia

On 30 December 2020, the amendments, contained in the Federal Law of 30 December 2020 №481-FZ "On Amendments to Legislative Acts of the Russian Federation regarding the Establishment Additional Measures to Counter the Threats to National Security", entered into force. In accordance to these amendments, special marking are envisaged not only for a publications of non-profit organizations declared a "foreign agent" but also for a publications of its founders, heads, members, employees. Individuals (Russian citizens, foreign citizens and stateless persons) also can be declared "foreign agent" for their political activity. Political activity is defined as any influence to public opinion including publications in social media and public policy including a sending a requests and petitions. Receiving funding from foreign sources is optional - it's quite enough to "carry out activity in favour" of foreign and international authorities, organizations, citizens and stateless persons. Individuals declared "foreign agent" are obliged to make special reporting and are deprived of the right to hold public office.

Unregistered public associations

The amendments, contained in the Federal Law of 30 December 2020 №481-FZ, provide the possibility to designate a public associations without juridical person status as "foreign agent" on the same basis as non-profit organizations. The Ministry of Justice created the register of unregistered public associations performing functions of a "foreign agent" on 1 June 2021.

Implications for NGOs
The foreign agent label increases registration barriers for an NGO in Russia. This includes restrictions on foreigners and stateless peoples from establishing or even participating in the organization. A NGO must then submit to extensive audits. Supervisory powers are allowed to intervene and interrupt the internal affairs of the NGO with suspensions for up to six months.

Once labeled as foreign agents, organizations are obliged to mark all their publications and to begin each oral statement with a disclosure that it is being given by a "foreign agent". It also limits the way a foreign organization can make tax-exempt donations to specific people or the NGO by requiring them to register and be placed on a very limited list of approved organizations.

Some NGOs report curtailed access to government officials and public institutions and continued harassment. NGO raids have been reported as being accompanied by television crews from TV channel NTV.

A Ministry of Justice report obtained by the Russian business daily Vedomosti in May 2016 said criticism of the "foreign agents" law qualifies as political activity under the "foreign agents" law.

Enforcement

2010s 
On 4 June 2014, an amendment to the "foreign agents law" came into force, authorizing the Ministry of Justice to register independent groups as "foreign agents" without their consent, if the ministry regards the organizations as engaged in "political activity" and if the organization is receiving foreign funding.

By 29 June 2015, according to a report by the Council of Europe Commissioner for Human Rights, the list of "foreign agents" included at least 70 NGOs. Of those, only five organizations voluntarily agreed to designate themselves "foreign agents". At least 20 NGOs have ceased their activity either in full or in part, including through "self-liquidation". The majority of organizations were included in the first half of 2015.

By 24 October 2016, according to a report by Human Rights Watch, the list of active "foreign agents" included 105 NGOs. Of those, four registered voluntarily and at least 58 were prosecuted for not doing so.

Law enforcement officers in Russia have raided the offices of several targeted organizations to seize documents and records related to their operation. Several prominent international organizations have been targeted, including Amnesty International, Human Rights Watch, and Transparency International. Overall, more than 55 organizations in 16 Russian regions have been audited. These raids are often joined by journalists from NTV, which has aired programs which accuse human rights and opposition activists of pushing the interests of the United States.

In June 2017, head of the human rights NGO "Union of Women of Don" Valentina Cherevatenko was formally charged with "malicious evasion" of legal requirements set out in the law, making it the first criminal proceedings initiated for non-compliance. Cherevatenko faces two years in prison.

Usually the legal basis for "foreign agent" designation is not available. Petr Manyakhin who was designated a "foreign agent" himself and countered this in a court, received a legal justification from Ministry of Justice who argued that Manyakhin received funding in foreign currencies based on three USD bank transfers, which were between Manyakhin's own accounts. Further reasons given were a single retweet in support of "Meduza" and Manyakhin's 2020 article about torture in Novosibirsk police.

2020s 
In September 2021 the law was amended and included a 60-item list of topics, covering which could be punished with adding to the register of foreign agents. By December 2021, more than 100 Russian media outlets were declared foreign agents, many of them were forced to close. No trial required, a request from the Justice Ministry is enough for declaring a person or organization ‘a foreign agent’, the Ministry doesn’t explain the reasons for inclusion. There are many cases when it contradicts common sense, for instance, the Golos Association was declared foreign agent for receiving the Sakharov Prize. The extended Foreign Agent law allowed the authorities to shut down Russia's oldest human rights NGO ‘Memorial’.

A 2021 report by OVD-Info goes into great detail about the existing legislation and practice of its application. While the government claims that the designation does not prevent freedom of speech, and merely ensures transparency about who is speaking, the report clearly indicates that the regulation had a strong chilling effect on media, which avoid quoting organizations and individuals designated as foreign agents, and the designated themselves withdraw from public debate as result of high financial fines imposed by Roscomnadzor for example for missing a long legal disclaimer even on a social media share of someone else's post. Furthermore, any entities designated as foreign agents are prohibited from acting as election observers, legislative experts, candidates to public supervisory commissions and other public functions. At the same time the criteria for the designation are extremely broad and vague, from actually receiving foreign grants to "participation in an international conference with accommodation at the expense of the organizer", "gift from friends or relatives living abroad" or even transfer of own funds from an own account in foreign currency.

By Spring 2022, dozens more of important Russian journalists, public activists and scientists were declared foreign agents: politicians Leonid Volkov, Garry Kasparov, Mikhail Khodorkovsky, political scientist Ekaterina Schulmann, journalists Roman Dobrokhotov, Yelizaveta Osetinskaya, Alexander Nevzorov, Alexei Venediktov, Vladimir Kara-Murza, historian Yevgeni Ponasenkov, satirist Viktor Shenderovich, youtube-blogger Yury Dud. A popular joke in Russian liberal society says that ‘All decent people are included into Foreign Agents list’. No case of removal from the register was recorded.

By end of April 2022 a series of new amendments to the Foreign Agents Law was offered by a group of State Duma deputies and was scheduled for submission in June of the same year. The amended document will combine all previously approved measures, introducing some extensions. For instance, if approved, it will allow the authorities to mark as foreign agents even people and organizations that do not receive any financial support abroad, unspecified ‘influence or pressure’ from some foreign actors will be enough. Their relatives and colleagues will be given status of ‘person, affiliated with foreign agent’, a special register for such individuals will also be established. Also, the commercial companies will be able to fall within the scope of the law. The amended law prohibits any educational public activity before audiences younger than 18 years, and allows the Ministry of Justice to block websites without court decision.

Notable cases
An organization that has been designated as a foreign agent can be looked up here:

Reactions

Russia
Russia's human rights commissioner, Vladimir Lukin, and several non-governmental groups filed an appeal with Russia's constitutional court, arguing that the law violated constitutional provisions on freedom of association (Article 30) and that the definitions of "political activities" and "foreign agents" in its text were too vague. On 8 April 2014, the court decided that the law did not infringe on the Constitutional right to association, and that the foreign agent designation was in the public interest.

Russia's Presidential Council for Human Rights, citing the targeting of Dynasty Foundation and the Committee Against Torture, called upon the Plenum of the Supreme Court to examine the practice of the courts in the application of the law.

In February 2016, the Russian PEN Center issued an open letter protesting amendments to the law which defined "political activity" as activity aimed at influencing the government or public opinion.

International
Secretary-general of the Council of Europe Thorbjorn Jagland expressed concerns about the law during a joint news conference with Sergei Lavrov, the Russian foreign minister, stating that "[The law] can have a chilling effect on the NGO community, particularly if this law is not being put into practice in the right manner."

Catherine Ashton, the High Representative of the Union for Foreign Affairs and Security Policy at the European Union, expressed concern about the law and resulting raids, stating that "The inspections and searches launched against the Russian NGO community and conducted on vague legal grounds are worrisome since they seem to be aimed at further undermining civil society in the country."

German chancellor Angela Merkel publicly rebuked President Putin while he visited Hanover, shortly after Russian officials searched and confiscated documents and equipment from two German NGOs operating in Russia.

German foreign minister Guido Westerwelle declared the moves against the nonprofits unacceptable and warned through a spokesperson that they could "have a sustained effect on bilateral relations."

The OSCE Parliamentary Assembly in its "Helsinki Declaration" from July 2015 called upon Russia to "end its attempts to stigmatize and discredit civil society groups by labeling them foreign agents".

The Venice Commission of the Council of Europe issued an opinion raising "several serious issues" with the formulation and implementation of the law according to Council of Europe standards. It called upon Russia to reformulate the vague criteria of "political activities", and to abandon the term "foreign agent", stating that "by bringing back the rhetoric used during the communist period, this term stigmatises the NCOs to which it is applied, tarnishing their reputation and seriously hampering their activities."

On 6 July 2021, the new opinion of the Venice Commission on Russian foreign agent law was published. According to the Venice Commission's conclusion, the recent amendments to Russia's "foreign agent" legislation take a clear direction towards expanding the scope of entities and individuals that qualify as "foreign agents" as well as expanding the obligations and restrictions on these entities and individuals. The recent amendments also significantly raise sanctions (administrative and criminal) for non-compliance with these regulations. At the same time, they tend to use vague and overly broad terminology and fail to have a reasonable relation to the aims allegedly pursued. As a result, they constitute serious violations of basic human rights, including the freedoms of association and expression, the right to privacy, the right to participate in public affairs, as well as the prohibition of discrimination. The Venice Commission is particularly concerned by the combined effect of the most recent amendments on entities, individuals, the media and civil society more broadly. The Venice Commission warns against the significant chilling effect that the recent reforms are likely to have on the free exercise of the civil and political rights which are vital for an effective democracy. The combined effect of the recent reforms enables authorities to exercise significant control over the activities and existence of associations as well as over the participation of individuals in civic life. The Venice Commission recommends that the Russian authorities abandon the special regime of registration, reporting, and public disclosure requirements for associations, media outlets and individuals receiving "foreign support", including the related administrative and criminal sanctions. Alternatively, the Venice Commission calls on the Russian authorities to thoroughly revise not only the most recent amendments but the entire body of its "foreign agent" legislation by significantly narrowing the legal definition of a "foreign agent" in order to serve the stated aim of transparency. Specifically, the notions of "political activities" and "foreign support" should be abandoned in favour of indicators that would reliably track objectionable forms of foreign interference. At a minimum, the stigmatising and misleading "foreign agent" label should be abandoned in favour of a more neutral and accurate designation. This new designation should not be used as a criterion for banning individuals from entering public service. Likewise, NCOs and media outlets so designated should not be prohibited from participating in campaign activities. Criminal sanctions, including especially compulsory labour and the deprivation of liberty, should not be applied to breaches of registration, reporting and public disclosure requirements for "foreign agents", even under the narrow definition of that designation. Further, the penalty of liquidation of NCOs should be reserved for extreme cases of violations threatening democracy.

NGOs
In 2015, the science and education supporting fund Dynasty Foundation run by Dmitry Zimin, founder of Vympelcom, closed after being forced to label itself as a "foreign agent". This decision of the Ministry of Justice has sparked a lot of criticism as "Dynasty" was not involved in politics and fully focused on national education in Russia. It also received no funds from foreign third parties, merely keeping part of their funds on foreign bank accounts. After mass protests of the academic community against this discrimination Zimin attempted appeals and when they remained unsuccessful, he decided to close the fund and left Russia.

The Committee Against Torture also declared the organisation will be closed after it lost an appeal against the justice ministry qualifying it as a "foreign agent".

According to Human Rights Watch, by August 2016 at least 13 groups chose to shut down rather than wear the "foreign agent" label.

Since the law was passed in Russia, Transparency International-Russia (TI-R) has fought it. In November 2012 the Board of the Center of TI-R issued a statement declaring the law unconstitutional, claiming it impairs their rights to organize and participate in governance. TI-R claims that the "foreign agent" law enacted by the Russian government is unconstitutional according to the Russian constitution based on its articles concerning freedom of speech and the right to participate in governance. TI-R was itself placed on the list of foreign agents in 2015.

See also
 List of Russian foreign agents
 Russian undesirable organizations law
 List of websites blocked in Russia
 Media freedom in Russia
 United States Foreign Agents Registration Act

References

External links
 Service for the search of non-profit organizations designated as "foreign agent" (in Russian)
 List of foreign media performing the functions of a "foreign agent" (in Russian) 
 Russian Duma chronology , bill No. 102766-6
 Full text of the law, publication No. 0001201207230003
 Russia's next ‘foreign agent' could be you, Meduza, December 5, 2020
 Who Has Russia Labeled As A 'Foreign Agent'?
 Daucé, F. (2015). The duality of coercion in Russia: cracking down on" foreign agents". Demokratizatsiya: The Journal of Post-Soviet Democratization, 23(1), 57-75.

Law of Russia
Human rights abuses in Russia
2012 in Russia
2012 in law
Russia–United States relations
Censorship in Russia